Strakhov (from страх meaning fear) is a Russian masculine surname, its feminine counterpart is Strakhova. It may refer to
Alexei Strakhov (born 1975), Ukrainian ice hockey player 
Daniil Strakhov (born 1976), Russian actor
Gennady Strakhov (born 1944), Russian wrestler
Irina Strakhova (born 1959), Russian race walker
Nikolai Mikhailovich Strakhov (1900–1978), Soviet geologist
Nikolay Strakhov (1828–1896), Russian philosopher, publicist and literary critic
Roman Strakhov (born 1995), Russian football midfielder
Valeriya Strakhova (born 1995), Ukrainian tennis player
Vyacheslav Strakhov (born 1950), Russian diver

See also
Strahov (disambiguation)

Russian-language surnames